Franch is a surname. Notable persons with that surname include:

 Adrianna Franch (born 1990), American football (soccer) player
 Josep Franch (born 1991), Spanish basketball player
 Pau Franch (born 1988), Spanish football (soccer) player

See also
 French (disambiguation)
France

Catalan-language surnames